The Old Road Campus is a University of Oxford site south of Old Road, in Headington, east Oxford, England. The Churchill Hospital, a teaching hospital managed by the Oxford University Hospitals NHS Foundation Trust, is to the south.

Facilities

Medicine 
The site is largely dedicated to medicine and includes the following:

 Kennedy Institute of Rheumatology
 NDM (Nuffield Department of Medicine) Research Building
 Target Discovery Institute
 Centre for Tropical Medicine and Global Health
 Henry Wellcome Building for Genomic Medicine
 Henry Wellcome Building for Molecular Physiology
 Offices of the Nuffield Professor of Medicine
 Henry Wellcome Building for Particle Imaging
 Nuffield Department of Population Health, Richard Doll Building
 Cancer Epidemiology Unit
 Clinical Trial Service Unit
 National Perinatal Epidemiology Unit
 Big Data Institute (BDI)
 Medical Sciences Division (MSD) IT Services
 Old Road Campus Research Building
 Department of Oncology
 CRUK/MRC Oxford Institute for Radiation Oncology
 Institute of Biomedical Engineering
 Jenner Institute
 Bodleian Knowledge Centre (Library Services)
 Ludwig Institute for Cancer Research
 Structural Genomics Consortium
 Nuffield Department of Surgical Sciences
 Innovation Building

Other facilities 
 Old Road Campus Estates Annexe
 Quad Offices
 Site Security Services
 Nursery
 Car Park

References 

Year of establishment missing
University of Oxford sites
English medical research